The Urban agglomeration of Les Îles-de-la-Madeleine is an urban agglomeration in Quebec that consists of:
the municipality of Les Îles-de-la-Madeleine
the municipality of Grosse-Île

History
As part of the 2000–2006 municipal reorganization in Quebec, the City of Les Îles-de-la-Madeleine was created on January 1, 2002 by the merger of the village municipality of Cap-aux-Meules and the municipalities of Fatima, Grande-Entrée, Grosse-Île, Havre-aux-Maisons, L'Étang-du-Nord, L'Île-du-Havre-Aubert.  In a 2004 referendum both Cap-aux-Meules and Grosse-Île voted to de-merge, but in the end only Grosse-Île de-merged and became an independent municipality again on January 1, 2006.

However, the legislation governing the de-merger process provided for the creation of a new municipal structure, an urban agglomeration, which would continue to tie de-merged cities to their former partners for the provision of various municipal services.

See also
 Urban agglomerations in Quebec
 Municipal history of Quebec

Les Iles-de-la-Madeleine